Burning Questions is a studio album by English singer and composer James Warren, former member of groups Stackridge and The Korgis. It was released on Sonet Records in 1986.

The album includes the singles "Burning Questions" (released as 'The Korgis', 1985), "True Life Confessions" ('The Korgis', 1985), "They Don't Believe In Magic" ('James Warren & The Korgis', 1986) and "It Won't Be The Same Old Place" (James Warren, 1986).

Burning Questions was re-issued on compact disc by Angel Air Records in 2007.

Track listing
Side A
"Burning Questions" (Davis/Warren) - 4:41
"Climate of Treason" (Warren) - 3:51
"They Don't Believe in Magic" (Warren) - 4:10
"Possessed" (Warren) - 4:11
"I Know Something" (Warren) - 3:10
Side B
"True Life Confessions" (Davis/Warren) - 4:17
"It Won't Be the Same Old Place" (Davis/Warren) - 4:59
"Loneliness" (Warren) - 4:10
"Can You Hear the Spirit Dying" (Warren) - 3:27
"I Want To Remember" (Warren) - 5:46

2007 CD bonus tracks
 You Made Me Believe" (previously unreleased) - 3:36
"How Did You Know?" (featuring Eddi Reader) (single 1987) - 3:46
"I'll Be Here" (B-side "They Don't Believe in Magic") (Warren) - 4:27

Critical reception

Upon release, Billboard noted: "His debut album provides the answer to the question "Is James Warren as a solo artist the equal of his work in his previous group and duo?" If anything, Warren's solo work is actually an improvement..." In a retrospective review, Jo-Ann Greene of AllMusic described the album as "very much a child of its time", with Warren doing a "brilliant" job on the songs, which she noted "put even his past hits to shame". Greene noted that the album, containing Warren's "strongest songs to date", suffered from a lack of promotion and was "consigned to the dust heap of history".

Personnel
 James Warren - lead vocals, backing vocals, electric guitars, acoustic guitar, bass guitar, (overdubbed extra percussion and guitars, September 2006)
 Nick Magnus - keyboards, real and synthesized percussion, synthesizer programming
 Glenn Tommey - (overdubbed extra percussion and guitars, September 2006)

Production
 James Warren - producer
 Andy Davis - co-producer "Burning Questions", "True Life Confessions" & "It Won't Be the Same Old Place"
 Recorded January - October 1985 at Sonet Studio, London.

Release history
 1986 Sonet Records, Sweden SNTF 956 (LP)
 2007 Angel Air Records, UK SJPCD217, (CD)

Single releases
Format: 7" unless otherwise noted.
 "True Life Confessions" / "Possessed" (Edit) - 3:55 (as 'The Korgis', Sonet SON 2277, June 1985)
 "True Life Confessions" (Extended) - 5:58 / "I Know Something" (Edit) - 2:53 / "Possessed" (Edit)- 3:48 (12") ('The Korgis', 12" SONL 2277, June 1985)
 "Burning Questions" / "Waiting For Godot" (non-album track) (Warren) - 3:34 ('The Korgis', SON 2284, November 1985)
 "Burning Questions" (Extended) - 8:04 / "Waiting For Godot" ('The Korgis', 12" SONL 2284, November 1985)
 "They Don't Believe in Magic" / "I'll Be Here" (non-album track) ('James Warren is The Korgis', SON 2302, July, 1986)
 "It Won't Be the Same Old Place" (Single remix by David Lord) - 4:23 / "Climate of Treason" (James Warren, SON 2311, November 1986)
 "How Did You Know?" (non-album track) / "Can You Hear the Spirit Dying" (James Warren, SON 2328, 1987)
 "True Life Confessions" ('88 Remix by Kenny Denton) - 3:19 / "Possessed" (edit) - 3:55 ('The Korgis', SON 2277, March 1988)

References

1986 albums
The Korgis albums
Sonet Records albums